is a former Japanese football player.

Playing career
Ryoji Mano played for FC Machida Zelvia, Azul Claro Numazu and Fujieda MYFC from 2013 to 2015.

References

External links

1990 births
Living people
Hosei University alumni
Association football people from Tokyo
Japanese footballers
J3 League players
Japan Football League players
FC Machida Zelvia players
Azul Claro Numazu players
Fujieda MYFC players
Association football forwards